Saint Namatius (French: Namace) is a saint in the Roman Catholic church.  He was the eighth or ninth bishop of Clermont (then called Arvernis) from 446 to 462, and founded Clermont's first  cathedral, bringing the relics of Saints Vitalis and Agricola to it from Bologna.  Of this construction project, Gregory of Tours writes:

References

Bishops of Clermont
5th-century bishops in Gaul
5th-century Christian saints
Gallo-Roman saints
462 deaths
Year of birth unknown